John Bentley Stringer (17 February 1928 – 4 May 1979) was a British computer pioneer. At Cambridge Maths Lab he worked with Maurice Wilkes creating the concept of microcode. He then became a civil servant firstly at the National Physical Laboratory then at the Government Communications Headquarters.

Publications

References

1928 births
1979 deaths
Members of the University of Cambridge Computer Laboratory
British computer scientists
Computer designers